Ian Edward "Ted" Atkins (8 November 1958 – 20 August 2018) was an English explorer, engineer, mountaineer and inventor.

Early life
Atkins was brought up in Cotgrave, Nottinghamshire, the son of a miner.

Career 
Atkins became Staff Officer for the Royal Air Force Mountain Rescue Service in charge of teams in Scotland. In this position he took the first RAF team to climb Mt. Everest in 2001.

Atkins spent a year in Antarctica, where he made 28 first ascents of mountains. He then served with the Royal Navy on HMS Endurance, principally as a marine engineer but also with the Royal Marines as Mountain Leader. In this role he was awarded his ‘Green Beret’ for work with the Marines on an Antarctic rescue mission where he led one of the two detachments. For his Antarctic work, he was invested with the Polar Medal by HM The Queen.

Climbing experience 
In 1979 Atkins volunteered for the Royal Air Force Mountain Rescue Service. From rock and winter climbing, Atkins went to the Alps and onto the Himalayas, first in 1983 to Manaslu then in 1988 onto the West Ridge of Everest, where he became involved with oxygen systems. The unsuccessful expedition was a forerunner of the RAF Everest Expedition in 2001, during which he and his partner, Dr. Brian Kirkpatrick, failed to summit with the RAF Everest team as a result of rescuing a civilian climber. Atkins went back to Everest, this time to the south in Nepal in 2004 to climb the mountain on his own. Observing the need for a good oxygen delivery system, he used his engineering experience to devise a solution, and later set up his own companies called Topout Oxygeneering and Topout Aero, in partnership with Dr. Ryan Jackson, to manufacture the "Multi-purpose Tactical Oxygen System (MTOS)".

Post RAF
Atkins began selling bottled oxygen for climbers through a company called Topout Oxygeneering, and was later credited by the Nepalese Mountaineering Association with reducing the death rate from 1:10 to less than 1:700. The demand was such that Atkins left the RAF to concentrate on his new business. He went on to produce a new cylinder, cylinder valve, regulator and flow controller. Eventually he built a plant to produce oxygen in Nepal in order to guarantee the quality of the gas.

He also collaborated with the Everest Skydive Team to develop a better oxygen system for jumps exiting the aircraft at a similar altitude to the summit of Everest. The Topout Aero skydive system went on to become the industry standard. At the same time he went to Ama Dablam Base Camp to make an attempt at a world record skydive, in tandem with Tom Noonan, landing at 15,000 feet above sea level.

In 2015, Atkins was advisor to chef Sat Bains when the latter launched an attempt to raise £100,000 for Community Action Nepal by hosting a dinner party 23,000 feet above sea level. Bains had to be brought down the mountain by Atkins and hospitalised. Atkins himself also set a record for a set the highest-ever boat ride, when he by paddling a collapsible boat over a glacial lake at 6,300 metres on the slopes of Everest.

Atkins was a Science and Engineering Ambassador for young people into science and engineering, and delivered talks in many countries, including Italy where he lived. In Nepal he was involved with several charity organizations and was a trustee of an orphanage. He wrote a column in the Nepali Times about the mountaineering experience in Nepal, with the aim of making things better. His last column was published on 18 May 2018, and recorded his concerns about the quality of oxygen equipment being sold to climbers.

Death
At the time of his death, Atkins was living in the Dolomites with his wife Shona and son, Lewis. and began calling himself "Teddy" because local people could not pronounce the name "Ted". He was killed descending Monte Civetta, one of the highest mountains in the range, in the province of Belluno (Italy), on 20 August 2018.

References

External links
http://www.nottinghampost.com/watch-man-skydive-25-000ft-with-no-parachute-and-it-was-made-possible-thanks-to-a-notts-engineer/story-29572550-detail/story.html
http://www.foxnews.com/tech/2016/12/02/military-veterans-smash-skydiving-world-records-in-himalayas.html
http://www.mounteverest.net/story/RAFsTedAtkins-AreturntoEverestSummitMay162004.shtml
http://nepalitimes.com/article/Nepali-Times-Buzz/Skydiving%20%E2%80%93off-%20the-%20sky-%20of-%20the-%20world%20,3367
http://news.sky.com/story/war-veterans-to-attempt-daring-everest-climb-10364697
http://www.abc.net.au/news/2015-08-19/bravery-commendation-for-rescuing-climbers-on-mount-everest/6705892

1958 births
2018 deaths
English explorers
English engineers
English mountain climbers
English inventors
Mountaineering deaths
Royal Air Force officers